No. 153 Helicopter Unit (Daring Dragons) is a Helicopter Unit and is equipped with Mil Mi-17 and based at Udhampur Air Force Station.

History

Assignments
During the Kargil War, the unit participated in several operations. The unit also had the first female aviator in the IAF, Gunjan Saxena.

Aircraft
Mil Mi-17

References

153